The Institute for Computational and Experimental Research in Mathematics (ICERM), founded in 2011, is an American research institute in mathematics at Brown University, funded beginning in 2010 by a grant from the National Science Foundation.

About 
At the time of its founding, the institute was the eighth of its kind in the nation and the first in New England. It is located in downtown Providence, Rhode Island in a building it shares with the Brown University School of Public Health. 

The Institute for Computational and Experimental Research in Mathematics (ICERM), hold numerous events and workshops throughout the year. Workshops range from one day events all the way up to week-long conferences and conventions. A notable ICERM workshop was, "Illustrating Mathematics" (2016), which brought mathematicians and digital artist together.

Directors of ICERM
 Jill Pipher (2011–2016)
 Brendan Hassett (2016–present)

References

External links

Mathematical institutes
Computer science institutes in the United States
Research institutes in Rhode Island
Brown University
National Science Foundation mathematical sciences institutes